Brigadier-General Sir Arthur Long  (26 February 1866 – 15 November 1941) was Director of Supplies and Transport in the British Army responsible for Macedonia and the Black Sea (1916-1919).

Career
Long was born in Bedfordshire on 26 February 1866, the son of James and Elizabeth Long of Henlow, Bedfordshire.  He was educated at Bedford Modern School.

Long joined the British Army in 1887.  During World War I Long was mentioned in despatches six times and vested with KBE, CB and CMG.  He was promoted to Director of Supplies and Transport for Macedonia and the Black Sea in 1916 and retired from the army in 1919.

In 1893 Long married Maud Eleanor, second daughter of the Rev. Canon James Kelly of Manchester.   He died in Kensington on 15 November 1941.  He was survived by his wife, a daughter, Mrs Moorhead who was the wife of Brigadier Moorhead, and two sons; Colonel P. J. Long, who was serving in India at the time of his death, and Mr A. L. Long, an engineer who was also based in India.

References

1866 births
1941 deaths
People educated at Bedford Modern School
Knights Commander of the Order of the British Empire
Companions of the Order of the Bath
Companions of the Order of St Michael and St George
Companions of the Distinguished Service Order
Prince of Wales's Leinster Regiment officers
Royal Army Service Corps officers
British Army generals of World War I
People from Henlow
British Army brigadiers
Military personnel from Bedfordshire